Danylo Hennadiyovych Polonskyi (born 14 November 2001) is a Ukrainian professional footballer who plays as an attacking midfielder for Ukrainian club Kryvbas Kryvyi Rih.

References

External links
 Profile on Kryvbas Kryvyi Rih official website
 
 

2001 births
Living people
Footballers from Dnipro
Ukrainian footballers
Association football midfielders
SC Dnipro-1 players
FC Kryvbas Kryvyi Rih players
Ukrainian First League players